The following lists events that happened during 1899 in New Zealand.

Incumbents

Regal and viceregal
Head of State – Queen Victoria
Governor – The Earl of Ranfurly GCMG

Government and law
The Liberal Party is re-elected and forms the 14th New Zealand Parliament. The number of MPs is increased to 80.

Speaker of the House – Sir Maurice O'Rorke
Prime Minister – Richard Seddon
Minister of Finance – Richard Seddon
Chief Justice – Sir Robert Stout replaced Hon Sir James Prendergast

Parliamentary opposition
 Leader of the Opposition – William Russell, (Independent).

Main centre leaders
Mayor of Auckland – David Goldie
Mayor of Christchurch – Charles Louisson
Mayor of Dunedin – William Swan followed by Robert Chisholm
Mayor of Wellington – John Rutherford Blair

Events 
 28 September: Prime Minister Richard Seddon asks Parliament to approve the offer to the imperial government of a contingent of mounted rifles and the raising of such a force if the offer were accepted and thus becoming the first British Colony to send troops to the Boer war. The first New Zealand Army contingent leaves for South Africa before the end of the year.
 2 November: Balloonist David Maloney (alias Captain Charles Lorraine) is blown out to sea after taking off from Lancaster Park. The balloon crashes into the sea and although Maloney is seen to survive by the time rescuers arrive there is no sign of him and his body is never found. This is the first aviation fatality in New Zealand.
 6 December: General election.
 19 December: Māori vote for the general election.

Undated
 The Government legislates that from 1900 Labour Day will be a public holiday.
 British expedition led by Carstens Borchgrevink, including several New Zealanders, establishes first base in Antarctica, at Cape Adare

Economy
 Kauri gum exports peak at 11,116 tons.

Arts and literature

Music

Sport

Athletics
National champions, Men
100 yards – George Smith (Auckland)
250 yards – W. Kingston (Otago)
440 yards – W. Kingston (Otago)
880 yards – C. Hill (Hawkes Bay)
1 mile – S. Pentecost (Canterbury)
3 miles – P. Malthus (South Canterbury)
120 yards hurdles – George Smith (Auckland)
440 yards hurdles – George Smith (Auckland)
Long jump – R. Brownlee (Otago)
High jump – R. Brownlee (Otago)
Pole vault – Jimmy Te Paa (Auckland)
Shot put – O. McCormack (Otago)
Hammer throw – W. Madill (Auckland)

Chess
National Champion: No tournament held in calendar year (see 1898)

Cricket

Golf
The National Amateur Championships were held in Wellington
 Men – Arthur Duncan (Wellington) – first title
 Women – K. Rattray (Otago) – second title

Horse racing

Harness racing
 Auckland Trotting Cup (over 2 miles) is won by Billy Wilson

Thoroughbred racing
 New Zealand Cup – Seahorse
 New Zealand Derby – Seahorse
 Auckland Cup – Blue Jacket
 Wellington Cup – Daunt

Season leaders (1898/99)
Top New Zealand stakes earner – Screw Gun
Leading flat jockey – C. Jenkins

Lawn Bowls
National Champions
Singles – W. Carswell (Taieri)
Pairs – T. Mackie and W. Carswell (skip) (Taieri)
Fours – A. Luoisson, H. Nalder, A. Bishop and W. Barnett (skip) (Christchurch)

Polo
Savile Cup winners – Oroua

Rowing
National Champions (Men)
Coxed fours – Picton
Coxless pairs – Wellington
Double sculls – Star
Single sculls – P. Graham (North Shore)

Rugby union
Provincial club rugby champions include:
see also :Category:Rugby union in New Zealand

Shooting
Ballinger Belt – Bandmaster W. King (Oamaru Rifles)

Soccer
Provincial league champions:
	Auckland:	Auckland United
	Otago:	Roslyn Dunedin
	Wellington:	Wellington Rovers

Swimming
National champions (Men)
100 yards freestyle – T. Edwards (Canterbury)
220 yards freestyle – J. Hamilton (Wellington)

Tennis
National championships
Men's singles – C. Cox
Women's singles – Kathleen Nunneley
Men's doubles – C. Cox and J. Collins
Women's doubles – Kathleen Nunneley and C. Lean

Births
25 March: Burt Munro, record-setting motorcyclist
14 June: Philip Skoglund, politician.
26 July: Charles William "Bill" Hamilton, inventor of the jetboat.
14 November: Philip Connolly, politician.

Deaths
 8 November: Thomas McDonnell, public servant and military leader.

See also
List of years in New Zealand
Timeline of New Zealand history
History of New Zealand
Military history of New Zealand
Timeline of the New Zealand environment
Timeline of New Zealand's links with Antarctica

References
General
 Romanos, J. (2001) New Zealand Sporting Records and Lists. Auckland: Hodder Moa Beckett. 
Specific

External links